Danene Sorace is an American politician and current mayor of Lancaster, Pennsylvania. She was elected as the 43rd mayor of Lancaster and "the second woman to serve in the position." She is a member of the Democratic Party. She received her bachelor's degree from Albright College and her master's degree in public policy from Rutgers University. She is also the former director of the Answer program at Rutgers.

Sorace won election as mayor in 2017 with 73 percent of the vote to 23 percent for Republican nominee Cindy Stewart, and three independent candidates garnering a combined 4 percent. She began her term on January 3, 2018. Prior to becoming mayor, she served one four-year term on the Lancaster city council where she headed the finance committee.

Sorace was reelected as mayor in 2021, defeating independent Willie E. Shell Sr.

Electoral history

References

External links
Danene Sorace – City of Lancaster
Sorace for Mayor – campaign site
Danene Sorace – Vote Smart profile

Living people
Mayors of Lancaster, Pennsylvania
Pennsylvania city council members
Pennsylvania Democrats
Women mayors of places in Pennsylvania
Year of birth missing (living people)
Women city councillors in Pennsylvania
21st-century American politicians
21st-century American women politicians
Albright College alumni
Rutgers University alumni